Asterophora lycoperdoides is a species of fungus in the Lyophyllaceae family. It grows as a parasite on other mushrooms, mainly those in the genus Russula. Its gills are poorly formed or nearly absent. Asexual spores are produced on the mushrooms cap which enable the organism to clone itself easily. The spores are star-shaped, hence the name star bearer. It is regarded as nonpoisonous but inedible.

Asterophora parasitica is similar but has more conic caps.

Taxonomy
The species was first named as Agaricus lycoperdonoides by French mycologist Jean Baptiste Francois Pierre Bulliard in 1784.

References

External links
 Mushroom Observer

Lyophyllaceae
Fungi described in 1784
Inedible fungi
Parasitic fungi
Taxa named by Jean Baptiste François Pierre Bulliard